The Little Revue was an American early-broadcast television series, which ran on the ABC network from 1949 to 1950.

The program broadcast music performers and other variety show elements. It was first broadcast on September 4, 1949, and stayed on Sunday evenings until March 1950, where it moved to Friday evenings. Its last performance was on April 21, 1950.

Regular performers included:
 Nancy Doran and Dick France
 Nancy Evans (1910–1963)
 Billy Johnson
 Dick Larkin
 Bill Sherry
 Gloria Van
 The Bill Weber Marionettes

See also
 1949–50 United States network television schedule

References
 Brooks, Tim and Marsh, Earle; The Complete Directory to Prime Time Network and Cable TV Shows,

External links
 The Little Revue at IMDB

1949 American television series debuts
1950 American television series endings
American Broadcasting Company original programming
Black-and-white American television shows